USS Kate was a steamer acquired by the Union Navy during the American Civil War. She was used by the Union Navy as a gunboat in support of the Union Navy blockade of Confederate waterways.

Construction 

Kate was built as Kate B. Porter at Belle Vernon, Pennsylvania, in 1864, and was purchased at Cincinnati, Ohio, by the Navy from J. B. Porter & Son, 23 December 1864; converted into a gunboat and commissioned at Mound City, Illinois, Acting Volunteer Lt. W. R. Wells in command.

Life 

Kates first duty was patrolling the Mississippi River from Mound City to Memphis, Tennessee, during the closing days of the Civil War. The tinclad gunboat was ordered downstream 28 April 1865 to intercept Confederate President Jefferson Davis in his flight toward freedom in exile. After his capture, she returned up the river to assist in the demobilization of the squadron.

After the war, she was sent to the Tennessee River to clear away the hulks of a number of sunken gunboats and barges. In August she was ordered to Jefferson Barracks Reserve to discharge her ordnance and to assist in disarming other vessels.

One of the last vessels in the Mississippi River to remain on naval duty, she decommissioned at Mound City 25 March 1866 and was sold at public auction there 4 days later. The gunboat was redocumented James J. Trover 12 April 1866 and stranded 300 miles below Fort Benton, Montana, 21 June 1867.

References 

Ships of the Union Navy
Ships built in Belle Vernon, Pennsylvania
Steamships of the United States Navy
American Civil War patrol vessels of the United States
Gunboats of the United States Navy
1864 ships